The following is a '''partial list of gymnasiums in Lithuania.

Alytus County

Alytus city
Alytus Adolfas Ramanauskas-Vanagas gymnasium
Alytus Putinų gymnasium
Alytus Jotvingių gymnasium
Alytus adult and youth school
Alytus Saint Benedict gymnasium

Alytus district
Butrimonys gymnasium
Simnas gymnasium
Daugai Vladas Mironas gymnasium

Druskininkai municipality
Druskininkai Ryto gymnasium

Lazdijai district
Lazdijai Motiejus Gustaitis gymnasium
Seirijai Antanas Žmuidzinavičius gymnasium
Veisiejai gymnasium

Tauragė County

Tauragė district
Tauragė Versmės gymnasium
Tauragė Žalgiriai gymnasium
Skaudvilė gymnasium
Žygaičiai gymnasium

Jurbarkas district
Jurbarkas Antanas Giedraitis-Giedrys gymnasium
Eržvilkas gymnasium
Veliuona Antanas and Jonas Juška gymnasium

Pagėgiai municipality
Pagėgiai Algimantas Mackus gymnasium

Šilalė district
Šilalė Simonas Gaudėšius gymnasium
Kaltinėnai Aleksandras Stulginskis Gymnasium
Kvėdarna Kazimieras Jaunius gymnasium
Laukuva Norbertas Vėlius gymnasium
Pajūris Stanislovas Biržiškis gymnasium

 
Lithuania
Lithuania
Schools
Schools
Schools